is a platform game developed and published by Hudson Soft for the Super Famicom. It was released in Japan on March 22, 1996, and later re-released for the Virtual Console in 2008.

Gameplay

DoReMi Fantasy is somewhat different from the original Milon's Secret Castle. This game is more of a straight platformer, while its predecessor combined platforming with puzzles and exploration, yet elements of the first title still remain.

The game also has a more lighthearted and whimsical tone than the original; it no longer takes place at a dark castle with multiple rooms, but in several thematic areas spread in seven worlds, which are displayed in a world map. Each world is divided by a few levels that must be cleared one after another, with a boss at the end. Before each boss battle, Milon must explore a dark fort/outpost which retains the most of the first game's elements, with each one being a large open stage requiring exploration to unlock new areas, find a hidden key and unlock the exit.

Milon's basic attack still consists of bubbles, although they are now used to trap enemies in them first and knock them away before said enemies escape. Like in the first game, Milon's bubbles can be used to destroy soft blocks to open secret areas and paths through the levels or uncover hidden items.

There are other, more powerful attack techniques and various power-ups are able to enhance Milon's bubble-blowing, such as ones that increase his range or the number of bubbles he can blow in one interval.

Unlike in the first title, Milon can now jump on enemies and stun them. This is only temporary, and using bubbles is the only method of properly defeating them.

Milon's health level is reflected by the clothes he is wearing. If he has not been touched, his clothes are colored green. When he is hit, his clothes will changed to blue, and later, red. If he is touched while wearing red, the player loses a life. The player is able to restore health by picking up overalls power-ups; one pair of overalls restores one unit of health, while twin overalls restore two. Unlike the first game, dying once does not necessarily mean game over, as the player can collect extra lives throughout the level. Milon can collect a variety of items to aid him throughout the level. These include winged boots that allow him to slow his descent by holding the B button in midair, bubblegum that will save him from a fall down a bottomless pit (but is consumed after it is used).

Plot
In the game, Milon is a young boy whose mission is to restore the music from the forest of his hometown and rescue his friend, the fairy Alis, from an evil wizard known as Amon responsible for the music's disappearance. To do this, he must collect a series of magic instruments that are being held by Amon's strongest minions. However, said instruments have had their power locked away after Amon corrupted them, so Milon must also collect stars to purify the instruments.

Development and release 
The game is a sequel to Milon's Secret Castle (1988). Art director for the game was Shoji Mizuno (character designer of Bomberman series).

It was released in Japan on March 22, 1996. The game has become a rare sought after collector's item. It was later re-released for the Wii's Virtual Console in North America in March 2008 and in Europe in September. The re-release was untranslated with Japanese text.

Reception 

Famitsus four reviewers gave it an average outlook. It received a 19.1 out of 30 score in a public poll taken by Family Computer Magazine. IGNs Lucas M. Thomas gave it a score of 7.5 out of 10. Nintendo Lifes Darren Calvert gave it a 9 out of 10. Eurogamers Dan Whitehead gave it an 8 out of 10.

Notes

References

External links 
 Official website (archived) 
 Nintendo Virtual Console site 

1996 video games
Hudson Soft games
Super Nintendo Entertainment System games
Video games developed in Japan
Virtual Console games
Japan-exclusive video games
Video games scored by Jun Chikuma